The 2019 Red Bull Air Race World Championship was the fourteenth and final Red Bull Air Race World Championship series. Red Bull has decided not to continue the Red Bull Air Race World Championship beyond the 2019 season.

Aircraft and pilots

Master Class

Challenger Class
 All Challenger Cup Pilots used a Zivko Edge 540 V2.

Pilot changes
 USA's Sammy Mason, Austrian Patrick Strasser and Swiss Vito Wyprächtiger will make their debuts in the Challenger Class.

Race calendar and results 
On 23 January 2019, it was announced that Red Bull Air Race will be held in Chiba on September 7th and 8th at the Muroya's kickoff meeting held in Tokyo. The eight-event calendar for the 2019 season was announced on 29 January 2019.

Races in Indianapolis, USA and Saudi Arabia which were to be held in October and November respectively were cancelled. Two more planned races, one in Europe and the other in Asia, did not have a venue at the time of the calendar reveal.

Championship standings

Master Class
Master Class Qualifying scoring system

Master Class scoring system

Challenger Class
Challenger Class scoring system

References

External links
 

 
Red Bull Air Race World Championship seasons
Red Bull Air Race
Red Bull Air Race